Alexandre-Édouard Kierzkowski (November 21, 1816 – August 4, 1870) was a civil engineer and political figure in Canada East.

Life 
He was born as Aleksander Edward Kierzkowski in the Grand Duchy of Poznań (now in Poland) and joined the Polish Army as an officer in an unsuccessful campaign against the Russians in 1830 to 1831. He was the son of the Jakub Filip Kierzkowski polish nobleman and officer and Marianna Garnysz. He moved to France and received a diploma as a civil engineer in Paris. He arrived in Canada in 1842. In 1845, he married Louise-Amélie Debartzch, daughter of Pierre-Dominique Debartzch, and, by marriage, became seigneur of parts of Saint-François-le-Neuf, Cournoyer, Debartzch, and L'Assomption. He became justice of the peace and was appointed major in the Richilieu militia in 1855.

In 1858, he was elected to the Legislative Council for the Montarville division, but he was disqualified in 1861 because the value of the property that he owned was not judged to be adequate. In 1861, he was elected to the 7th Parliament of the Province of Canada representing Verchères; his election was declared invalid in 1863. In 1868, after the death of his first wife, he married Caroline-Virginie, his wife's cousin and the daughter of François-Roch de Saint-Ours. In 1867, he was elected to the House of Commons of Canada representing St. Hyacinthe; he died while still in office at Saint-Ours, Quebec in 1870. He is believed to have returned from a trip to his native country with some Polish soil that was later buried with him.

Electoral record

External links
 
 
Alexandre-Édouard Kierzkowski fonds, Library and Archives Canada. 
 

1816 births
1870 deaths
Liberal Party of Canada MPs
Members of the House of Commons of Canada from Quebec
Members of the Legislative Assembly of the Province of Canada from Canada East
Members of the Legislative Council of the Province of Canada
Polish emigrants to Canada
Canadian justices of the peace